The Morning after Death is a 1966 detective novel by Cecil Day-Lewis, written under the pen name of Nicholas Blake. It is the sixteenth and last entry in the series of novels featuring the private detective Nigel Strangeways.

Synopsis
Strangeways is in America visiting the Ivy League Cabot University near Boston to do some research. When the body of a classics professor is found stuffed into a locker, he is reluctantly drawn into the murder investigation.

References

Bibliography
 Reilly, John M. Twentieth Century Crime & Mystery Writers. Springer, 2015.
 Stanford, Peter. C Day-Lewis: A Life. A&C Black, 2007.

1966 British novels
Novels by Cecil Day-Lewis
British crime novels
Collins Crime Club books
British detective novels